Malva is a 1957 Soviet drama film based on the stories of Maxim Gorky Mallow and Two tramp.

Plot 
The history of rivalry father and son from the love of one woman.
Once a farmer Basil left his native village, leaving his wife and his son Jacob. For many years he worked in the fishing industry, which, forgetting about family, friends with beautiful fisherwoman Malva and lived a serene life. But grown-up son came to his father. Soon relationships between him and Malva led to conflicts with his father ...

Cast
Dzidra Ritenberga — Malva
Pavel Usovenichenko — Vasily
Anatoly Ignatiev — Yakov
Gennadi Yukhtin — Seryozhka
Arkady Tolbuzin — clerk
Ivan Matveev — Stepok

Awards
 Dzidra Ritenberga - winner of the international Film Festival in Venice for Best Actress (1957)

References

External links
 
  Malva at the  kinopoisk.ru 

1957 films
Films based on works by Maxim Gorky
Soviet drama films
Russian drama films
1957 drama films